Gorka Podselnaya is a rural locality (a village) in Azletskoye Rural Settlement, Kharovsky District, Vologda Oblast, Russia. The population was 3 as of 2002.

Geography 
Gorka Podselnaya is located 54 km northwest of Kharovsk (the district's administrative centre) by road. Martynikha is the nearest rural locality.

References 

Rural localities in Kharovsky District